Programmer art refers to temporary assets added by the programmer to test functionality. When creating the graphics, speed is a priority and aesthetics are secondary (if they are given any consideration at all). In fact, programmer art might be intentionally bad, to draw attention to the fact that the graphics are merely placeholders and should not be shipped with the final product. This practice might also speed its replacement.

Common forms of programmer art include stick figure sprites in platformer games, and fuchsia textures in games using 3D models. Games with a "top-down" perspective tend to use alphanumeric characters and simple 2D graphics to represent characters and landscape elements.

Not all programmers decide to replace the assets in their software prior to release, though. This is especially common in indie games, since indie developers generally lack the resources to commission large amounts of assets for their games. 

Computer art